EdgeHTML is a proprietary browser engine from Microsoft that was formerly used in Microsoft Edge, which debuted in 2015 as part of Windows 10.

EdgeHTML is a fork of the MSHTML (Trident) engine of Internet Explorer. It is designed as a software component that enables developers to easily add web browsing functionality to other apps.

In 2018, Microsoft began rebuilding Edge as a Chromium-based browser, which meant that EdgeHTML would no longer be used in the Edge browser. This transition was completed in April 2021. Past this date, EdgeHTML does, however, continue to be supported and widely used in Universal Windows Platform apps.

History 
Microsoft first introduced the EdgeHTML rendering engine as part of Internet Explorer 11 in the Windows Technical Preview build 9879 on November 12, 2014. Microsoft planned to use EdgeHTML both in Internet Explorer and Project Spartan; in Internet Explorer it would exist alongside the Trident 7 engine from Internet Explorer 11, the latter being used for compatibility purposes. However, Microsoft decided to ship Internet Explorer 11 in Windows 10 as it was in Windows 8.1, leaving EdgeHTML only for the then new Edge browser. EdgeHTML was also added to Windows 10 Mobile and the second Windows Server 2016 Technical Preview. It was officially released on July 29, 2015 as part of Windows 10.

Unlike Trident, EdgeHTML does not support ActiveX. It also drops support for the X-UA-Compatible header, used by Trident to determine in which version it had to render a certain page. Microsoft also dropped the usage of Compatibility View-lists. Edge will recognize if a page requires any of the removed technologies to run properly and suggest to the user to open the page in Internet Explorer instead. Another change was spoofing the user agent string, which claims to be Chrome and Safari, while also mentioning KHTML and Gecko, so that web servers that use user agent sniffing send Edge users the full versions of web pages instead of reduced-functionality pages.

EdgeHTML's rendering was meant to be fully compatible with the rendering of the Blink and WebKit layout engines, used by Google Chrome and Safari, respectively. At the time, Microsoft stated that "any Edge-WebKit differences are bugs that we’re interested in fixing."

Breaking from Trident, the new EdgeHTML engine will be focused on modern web standards and interoperability, rather than compatibility. The initial release of EdgeHTML on Windows 10 included more than 4000 interoperability fixes.

On August 18, 2015, Microsoft released the first preview to EdgeHTML platform version 13 as part of Windows 10.0.10525, though it was still labeled as version 12. In subsequent updates, the support for HTML5 and CSS3 was extended to include new elements.

EdgeHTML 13.10586 was released in multiple versions of Windows. On November 12, 2015, the New Xbox One Experience-update for the Xbox One included EdgeHTML 13.10586, replacing Internet Explorer 10 in the process. It was released to Windows 10 as part of the November Update on the same day. On November 18, 2015, the updated got rolled out to Windows 10 Mobile users in the Insider Preview. Finally, Microsoft rolled out the same update to Windows Server 2016 as part of Technical Preview 4.

On December 16, 2015, Microsoft released the first build of Redstone. In January and February 2016, 4 other builds followed, all laying the foundational work for EdgeHTML 14. On February 18, 2016, Microsoft released the first version of EdgeHTML 14 as version 14.14267. This version of the engine contained almost no changes in standards support yet, but contained fundamental work for Web Notifications, WebRTC 1.0, improved ECMAScript and CSS support and also contained a number of new flags. Further, Microsoft announced that it was working on VP9, WOFF 2.0, Web Speech API, WebM, FIDO 2.0, and Beacon API.

Releases

See also 
 Chakra, the JavaScript engine that worked in tandem with EdgeHTML in Microsoft Edge Legacy
 Comparison of browser engines

References 

Internet Explorer
Layout engines
Microsoft Edge
Windows web browsers